TV easy was a television mass market, listings magazine notable for its compact size. It was published in the United Kingdom by TI Media. Its focus is on popular TV, with emphasis on soaps. It was aimed at busy young families.

TV easy belonged to TI Media's family of TV entertainment magazines, which belong to the sub-group Connect. This includes its sister title What's on TV, as well as TV Times, TV & Satellite Week and the soap bi-weekly Soaplife.

Time Inc has marked the killing-off of the IPC name with two changes. First is the closure of its compact TV listings weekly TV Easy, with some features of the magazine being taken on by What’s On TV, its best-selling TV guide. The first combined issue went on sale on 30 September 2014.

Editor Richard Clark is a former editor of Webuser magazine.

References

2005 establishments in the United Kingdom
2014 disestablishments in the United Kingdom
Television magazines published in the United Kingdom
Weekly magazines published in the United Kingdom
Defunct magazines published in the United Kingdom
Listings magazines
Magazines established in 2005
Magazines disestablished in 2014